APL Raffles is a Temasek-class container ship operated by APL. It was built in 2013 by Hyundai Heavy Industries at their Samho shipyard in South Korea.

Design and engineering
The vessel is equipped with 1,200 reefer plugs for transportation of temperature controlled cargo.

Engineering
The main engine is a Hyundai-MAN B&W 11S90ME-C9.2 with output power of 85,704 hp. The power is enough for the service to operate with speed of 19.5 kts, while the maximum speed under ballast exceeds 22.5 kts. The vessel has improved characteristics through lower resistance hull shape and paint, which reduces over-growth.

References

External links
APL Raffles characteristics and engineering

2013 ships
Container ships
Merchant ships of Singapore
Ships of APL
Ships built by Hyundai Heavy Industries Group

de:APL-Temasek-Typ